Mikhail Fyodorovich Mustafin (born 11 July 1983) is a Russian former professional football player.

Club career
He played in the Russian Football National League for FC Volga Ulyanovsk in 2008.

References

External links
 

1983 births
Living people
Russian footballers
Association football midfielders
FC Volga Ulyanovsk players